Sabato sera – Studio Uno '67 is an album by Italian singer Mina, issued in 1967. Re-issued on CD by BMG in 1997.

Track listing

Side A

Side B

1967 albums
Italian-language albums
Mina (Italian singer) albums